The 2014 Prémio Autores was the fifth edition of the Prémio Autores. It took place on 8 May 2014 at the Salão Nobre dos Paços do Concelho of the Câmara Municipal of Lisbon, Portugal.

Winners and nominees
Winners are listed first and highlighted in boldface.

Visual arts
Best Photographic Work
Rei Capitão Soldado Ladrão, by Jorge Molder
Andar, abraçar, by Helena Almeida
Time Machine, by Edgar Martins
Best Plastic Arts Exhibition
A Substância do Tempo, by Jorge Martins
Arte Vida/Vida Arte, by Alberto Carneiro
Palácio Nacional da Ajuda, by Joana Vasconcelos
Best Scenographic Work
O Preço, by António Casimiro and João Lourenço
A Noite, by Ana Paula Rocha
Waiting for Godot, by João Mendes Ribeiro

Dance
Best Choreography
Salto, by André Mesquita
Abstand, by Luís Marrafa and António Cabrita
Fica no Singelo, by Clara Andermatt

Film
Best Actor
Gonçalo Waddington (Até Amanhã, Camaradas)
Rui Morisson (Photo)
Pedro Hestnes (Em Segunda Mão)
Best Actress
Maria João Bastos (Bairro)
Anabela Moreira (É o Amor (Obrigação))
Carla Chambel (Quarta Divisão)
Best Film
A Última Vez Que Vi Macau, by João Pedro Rodrigues and João Rui Guerra da Mata
É o Amor (Obrigação), by João Canijo
Em Segunda Mão, by Catarina Ruivo
Best Screenplay
Luís Filipe Rocha (Até Amanhã, Camaradas)
Carlos Saboga (Photo)
Catarina Ruivo and António Pedro Figueiredo (Em Segunda Mão)

Literature
Best Children's and Juvenile Book
O Senhor Pina, written by Álvaro Magalhães, illustrated by Luiz Darocha
Irmão Lobo, written by Carla Maia de Almeida, illustrated by António Jorge Gonçalves
O Rei Vai à Caça, written by Adélia Carvalho, illustrated by Marta Madureira
Best Narrative Fiction Book
Para Onde Vão os Guarda-Chuvas, by Afonso Cruz
A Rocha Branca, by Fernando Campos
No Labirinto de Centauro, by Rui Vieira
Best Poetry Book
Gaveta do Fundo, by A. M. Pires Cabral
A Fome Apátrida das Aves, by Francisco Duarte Mangas
Instituto de Antropologia, by Jorge Reis-Sá

Music
Best Album
Almost Visible Orchestra, by Noiserv
As Viúvas Não Temem a Morte, by Ciclo Preparatório
Gisela João, by Gisela João
Best Erudite Music Work
Magnificat, by António Pinho Vargas
Fanfarra Ciclópica, by Luís Cardoso
Livro de Florbela, by Nuno Côrte-Real
Best Song
"Lenço Enxuto", by Samuel Úria
"Gosto de me Drogar", by JP Simões
"How I Feel", by João Vieira

Radio
Best Radio Program
5 Minutos de Jazz, by José Duarte (Antena 1)
Em Sintonia, by António Cartaxo (Antena 2)
Programa da Manhã, by Pedro Ribeiro and team (Rádio Comercial)

Television
Best Entertainment Program
Odisseia, by Gonçalo Waddington, Bruno Nogueira and Tiago Guedes, directed by Tiago Guedes (RTP)
Conta-me História, by Luís Filipe Borges (RTP)
Música Maestro, by Rui Massena (RTP)
Best Fiction Program
Linhas de Torres, by Carlos Saboga, directed by Valeria Sarmiento (RTP)
Belmonte, adapted by Artur Ribeiro with Cláudia Sampaio, Elisabete Moreira, Joana Pereira da Silva, Nuno Duarte, Simone Pereira, directed by António Borges Correia, Jorge Humberto Carvalho, Jorge Queiroga and Nuno Franco (TVI)
Uma Família Açoriana, by João Nunes, directed by João Cayatte (RTP)
Best Information Program
Travessia no Deserto, by Mafalda Gameiro (RTP)
A Prova, by Sofia Pinto Coelho (SIC)
Quadratura do Círculo (SIC Notícias)

Theatre
Best Actor
João Perry (O Preço)
Elmano Sancho (O Campeão do Mundo Ocidental)
Miguel Borges (Yerma)
Best Actress
Flávia Gusmão (As Centenárias)
Maria João Pinho (O Campeão do Mundo Ocidental)
Maya Booth (Actor Imperfeito)
Best Performed Portuguese Text
Sabe Deus Pintar o Diabo, by Abel Neves
Coragem Hoje, Abraços Amanhã, by Joana Brandão
Finge, by Carlos J.Pessoa
Best Show
Yerma, by João Garcia Miguel
O Preço, by João Lourenço
4 AD HOC, by Luís Miguel Cintra

References

2013 film awards
2013 music awards
2014 in Portugal
Premio Autores 2014
 2014 Premio Autores